Belavabary is a town and commune in Madagascar. It belongs to the district of Moramanga, which is a part of Alaotra-Mangoro Region. The population of the commune was estimated to be approximately 10,000 in 2001 commune census.

Primary and junior level secondary education are available in town. The majority 95% of the population of the commune are farmers.  The most important crop is rice, while other important products are ginger, beans and cassava.  Industry and services provide employment for 2% and 3% of the population, respectively.

References and notes 

Populated places in Alaotra-Mangoro